The Anger and the Truth is the third full-length album by the Boston street punk band The Unseen.

Track listing
 "Live in Fear" (lyrics: Mark / music: Scott) (2:15)
 "Something to Say" (lyrics & music: Paul) (1:52)
 "Give In to Hate" (lyrics: Tripp / music: Paul) (2:06)
 "1,000 Miles" (Lyrics: Mark, Paul, & Tripp / Music: Scott) (1:24)
 "The Anger and the Truth" (lyrics & music: Paul) (2:18)
 "No Turning Back" (lyrics & music: Tripp) (1:32)
 "What Happened?" (lyrics: Paul / music: Paul & Tripp) (2:45)
 "No Master Race" (lyrics: Mark / music: Scott) (2:23)
 "Never Forget" (lyrics & music: Tripp) (1:55)
 "Where Have You Gone?" (lyrics: Mark / music: Scott) (2:38)
 "Fight for a Better Life" (lyrics & music: Paul) (2:20)
 "No Evacuation" (Lyrics & Music: Brian "Chainsaw" Reily) (2:16)

Personnel
Mark – Drums, Vocals
Paul – Guitar, Drums, Vocals
Tripp – Bass, Vocals
Scott – Guitar

References

External links
The Anger and The Truth @ discogs.com

The Unseen (band) albums
2001 albums
BYO Records albums